Pyrgilauda is a genus of passerine birds in the sparrow family Passeridae. They are found in the Himalayas, Tibet and western China.

The genus name was introduced by the French naturalist Charles Lucien Bonaparte in 1850. The type species was designated by Jules Verreaux in 1871 as Père David's snowfinch. The name is a portmanteau of the genera Pyrgita Cuvier 1817, "sparrow", and Alauda Linnaeus, 1758, "lark".

The genus contains four species:

These species are sometimes included in the genus Montifringilla.

References 

 
Passeridae
Bird genera